Frederick Sheppard Grimwade  (10 November 1840 – 4 August 1910) was a businessman and Victorian member of parliament.

Born in Norfolk, England, Grimwade arrived in Victoria in 1863.  In 1867 he bought a pharmaceutical company and renamed it Felton Grimwade & Co.; it soon became the largest in the colony, prospering well into the next century. Today some of Australia's largest public companies have a lineage going back to his family and businesses.

Grimwade represented North Yarra Province in the Legislative Council for thirteen years from 1891. He opposed gambling, workers' compensation, old-age pensions and the national harmonization of time zones, but he passionately and successfully advocated for the legalization of cremation.

Legacy
Frederick Grimwade was buried in St Kilda Cemetery on 5 August 1910.  His mansion, "Harleston" (1875), was later donated by his family to Melbourne Grammar School and renamed Grimwade House.  His country retreat at Somers on the Mornington Peninsula, "Coolart", eventually became a public wetlands reserve.

Grimwade's children included Major General Harold Grimwade, who was a businessman and pharmacist and served as an artillery officer in France during World War I, and Russell Grimwade, who was a chemist, botanist, industrialist and philanthropist.

References

1840 births
1910 deaths
Victoria (Australia) state politicians
Members of the Victorian Legislative Council
People from Norfolk
English emigrants to Australia
19th-century Australian politicians
20th-century Australian politicians
19th-century Australian businesspeople